The 1998 Northeast Conference baseball tournament began on May 11 and ended on May 12, 1998, at Cochrane Stadium in Jersey City, New Jersey.  The league's top four teams competed in the single elimination tournament.  Rain severely impacted the event, forcing both a venue change and a format change.  The tournament was originally intended to be a double-elimination tournament at Waterfront Park in Trenton, New Jersey.  Second-seeded  won their first tournament championship, then won the NCAA play-in series against Navy to advance to the 1998 NCAA Division I baseball tournament.

Seeding and format
The top four finishers were seeded one through four based on conference regular-season winning percentage.  Due to rain, the standard double-elimination format was abandoned in favor of a single-elimination tournament.

Bracket

Most Valuable Player
Joe McCullough was named Tournament Most Valuable Player.  McCullough was a second baseman for Monmouth.

References

Tournament
Northeast Conference Baseball Tournament
Northeast Conference baseball tournament
Northeast Conference baseball tournament